Chen Qi (born 10 March 1982 in Shanghai) is a Chinese javelin thrower.

He finished fourth at the 2006 IAAF World Cup and the 2006 Asian Games and won the 2007 Asian Championships. He won the gold medal at the 11th Chinese National Games in 2009.

His personal best throw is 81.38 metres, achieved in May 2004 in Shijiazhuang.

Achievements

Seasonal bests by year
2000 - 77.88
2001 - 77.89
2002 - 77.72
2003 - 77.32
2004 - 81.38
2005 - 79.31
2006 - 80.30
2007 - 78.07
2008 - 79.25
2009 - 79.57
2010 - 78.65
2011 - 80.76
2012 - 77.78
2013 - 75.88

References

1982 births
Living people
Athletes (track and field) at the 2008 Summer Olympics
Chinese male javelin throwers
Olympic athletes of China
Athletes from Shanghai
Athletes (track and field) at the 2002 Asian Games
Athletes (track and field) at the 2006 Asian Games
Asian Games competitors for China
21st-century Chinese people